KLIL (92.1 FM, "Stereo 92.1") is a radio station licensed to the community of Moreauville, Louisiana, United States. The station is owned by Cajun Broadcasting, Inc. It airs a classic hits music format from Westwood One.  Its studios and transmitter are co-located in Moreauville.

KLIL is an affiliate of the New Orleans Saints radio network.

The station was assigned the KLIL call letters by the Federal Communications Commission on April 28, 1980.

References

External links

Radio stations in Louisiana
Classic hits radio stations in the United States